Albany is a city in the U.S. state of Georgia. Located on the Flint River, it is the seat of Dougherty County, and is the sole incorporated city in that county. Located in southwest Georgia, it is the principal city of the Albany, Georgia metropolitan area. The population was 77,434 at the 2010 U.S. Census, making it the eighth-largest city in the state. It became prominent in the nineteenth century as a shipping and market center, first served by riverboats. Scheduled steamboats connected Albany with the busy port of Apalachicola, Florida. They were replaced by railroads. Seven lines met in Albany, and it was a center of trade in the Southeast. It is part of the Black Belt, the extensive area in the Deep South of cotton plantations. From the mid-20th century, it received military investment during World War II and after, that helped develop the region. Albany and this area were prominent during the civil rights era, particularly during the early 1960s as activists worked to regain voting and other civil rights. Railroad restructuring and reduction in the military here caused job losses, but the city has developed new businesses.

History
Albany is located in a region which was long inhabited by the Creek Indians, who called it Thronateeska after their word for "flint", the valuable mineral found in beds near the Flint River. They used it for making arrowheads and other tools. In 1830 Congress passed the Indian Removal Act, and the United States made treaties to extinguish Creek and other Native American land claims in the Southeast. The US Army forcibly removed most of the native peoples to Indian Territory, lands west of the Mississippi River.

Nelson Tift

European-American settlement began with Nelson Tift of Groton, Connecticut, who took land along the Flint River in October 1836 after Indian removal.  Tift and his colleagues named the new town Albany after the capital of New York; noting that New York's Albany was a commercial center located at the headwaters of the Hudson River, they hoped that their town near the headwaters of the Flint would prove to be just as successful. It proved to be nowhere near as prosperous. Alexander Shotwell laid out the town in 1836, and it was incorporated as a city by an act of the General Assembly of Georgia on December 27, 1838.

Tift was the city's leading entrepreneur for decades. An ardent booster, he promoted education, business, and railroad construction. During the Civil War he provided naval supplies and helped build two ships.  He opposed Radical Reconstruction inside the state and in Congress, and was scornful of the Yankee carpetbaggers who came in. Historian John Fair concludes that Tift became "more Southern than many natives." His pro-slavery attitudes before the war and his support for segregation afterward made him compatible with Georgia's white elite.

This area was developed for cotton cultivation by planters, who used numerous enslaved African Americans to clear lands and process the cotton. As a result of the planters' acquisition of slave workers, by 1840 Dougherty County's majority population was black, composed overwhelmingly of slaves.  The market center for cotton plantations, Albany was in a prime location for shipping cotton to other markets by steamboats. In 1858, Tift hired Horace King, a former slave and bridge builder, to construct a toll bridge over the river. King's bridge toll house still stands.

Already important as a shipping port, Albany later became an important railroad hub in southwestern Georgia. Seven lines were constructed to the town. An exhibit on trains is located at the Thronateeska Heritage Center in the former railroad station.

Carey Wentworth Styles
After the war, Carey Wentworth Styles moved to Albany and founded the newspaper Albany News. In the early years following the war, Styles, like Tift, took great exception to the Radical Reconstruction program then in force, and advocated for a more moderate response based on his interpretation of Georgia's rights under the Constitution.  Styles backed "constitutional reconstruction" advanced by Benjamin H. Hill and sought support for the idea from the national Democratic party. While on a trip to Atlanta in May 1868, to meet with Democratic party leaders, Styles took measure of the contemporary Atlanta newspapers, and found them lacking.  Styles believed them to be little more than organs for the Radical Republican reconstruction agenda. He resolved to bring a paper aligned with the Democratic party viewpoint to the Atlanta market, one supporting his constitutional reconstruction ideals. Styles moved from Albany to Atlanta, and on May 9 he announced that he had obtained the necessary financial backing to purchase the Daily Opinion.  On June 16, 1868 the new Democratic daily (as he described it) printed its first edition, under the name The Constitution. Styles' tenure at the Atlanta Constitution would be brief. Unable to pay for his portion of the purchase, when the sale of his Albany News fell through, Styles was forced to surrender his interest in the paper to his joint venture partners. Styles returned to Albany as editor of the News. In 1872, he was elected to the Georgia Senate, representing Augusta and surrounding communities, in an ironic turn of events, having killed a member of the Georgia House of Representatives in his earlier years. After his legislative service, Styles sold the Albany newspaper in 1876 and returned to Atlanta.

20th century to present
While integral to the economic life of the town, the Flint River has flooded regularly. It caused extensive property damage in 1841 and 1925. The city has also been subject to tornadoes. On February 10, 1940, a severe tornado hit Albany, killing eighteen people and causing large-scale damage.

On April 11, 1906, the Carnegie Library, created by matching funds from the philanthropist Andrew Carnegie, was opened downtown. Originally a segregated facility under Jim Crow laws, it was not open to African Americans until after the passage of the Civil Rights Act of 1964. It functioned as a library through 1985. In 1992, after renovation, the building was reopened as the headquarters of the Albany Area Arts Council.

In 1912, the downtown U.S. Post Office and courthouse building opened. Other federal projects have been important to the city and region. In 1937, Chehaw Park was constructed as a part of a New Deal program under the administration of President Franklin D. Roosevelt during the Great Depression.

Major changes came with the expansion of military facilities in the city, secured by the powerful Southern Block in Congress.  A U.S. Army Air Corps training base was built near Albany on land owned by the city and leased to the Air Corps for $1 a year.  Construction of the base and airfield by the Army Corps of Engineers began on March 25, 1941. After being used during World War II, the airfield was temporarily deactivated between August 15, 1946, and September 1, 1947.

After the beginning of the Cold War and the founding of the U.S. Air Force in late 1947, the airfield was reactivated and upgraded with runways for a U.S. Air Force base.  It was named Turner Air Force Base. The Air Force used this base for heavy bomber jets, such as the B-52 Stratofortress. A number of other Air Force units were also housed at this base.
 Among them were the 1370th Photomapping Group, and refueling and maintenance functions.

In 1951, the U.S. Marine Corps established a logistics base on the eastern outskirts of Albany.  During the 1950s and 1960s, so many white servicemen and associated workers arrived that the city briefly became majority white for the first time since 1870.

In 1960, the population of Albany reached 50,000 people. During 1961–1962, African Americans in Albany played a prominent role in the Civil Rights Movement (see the Albany Movement). They led protests and non-violent demonstrations to end segregation of public facilities, gain the right to vote, and advance social justice. Assisted by activists from SCLC, CORE, SNCC, and the NAACP, African Americans and supporters took a stand to fight segregation through nonviolence. The city repealed its Jim Crow laws in 1963, but African Americans did not recover the ability to exercise their voting rights until Congress passed enforcement authority with the Voting Rights Act of 1965.

In 1967, the Air Force closed all its operations at the base, which was transferred to the U.S. Navy and renamed Naval Air Station Albany.   NAS Albany was used as the shore base of nearly all the Navy's RA-5C Vigilante twin-jet, carrier-based reconnaissance aircraft. In 1974, the base was closed and the property was returned to the city.

In 1979, the Miller Brewing Company purchased part of the old naval base's property to build a new brewery.

The decline in military bases and railroad restructuring nationwide both led to job losses in the Albany area. Much of the remaining white population moved to suburbs and newer housing out of the city, which became majority African American in the 1970s. Struggling with a poor economy, in 1988 Albany made national headlines as the "Murder Capital of America," with the highest murder rate per capita in the United States. Other cities have since taken that title.

Some late twentieth-century floods have been extreme. In 1994, a severe flood was caused by rainfall from Tropical Storm Alberto; it killed 14 people and displaced 22,000. The state supported a $150 million renovation of the Albany State University campus to repair storm damage and complete upgrades. New housing was built on the south side of town to replace what had been destroyed.

Because of such flooding, the city has decided against redeveloping areas along the riverfront floodplain for commercial or residential purposes.  This area is being improved for other uses, with a riverfront walkway and a new aquarium built over a tributary creek.

On January 2 and 22, 2017, violent tornadoes passed through the area, claiming several lives and destroying mobile home parks in the process.
On October 10, 2018 Hurricane Michael, the first major hurricane (Category 3+) to directly impact Georgia since the 1890s, plowed through South Georgia leaving widespread devastation in its path.

Geography
Albany is located at (31.582273, −84.165557). It lies in a belt of historically rich farmland in the East Gulf coastal plain, on the banks of the Flint River.

Topography
Albany lies in the Upper Coastal Plain of Georgia.

Location

Tree canopy
, the City of Albany had been a member of the Arbor Day Foundation's Tree City USA Program for 23 years. Tree-lined streets are common, with large, mature oaks and other native trees. The city has a Tree Ordinance and a certified arborist on staff.

Parks, gardens, and trails

Parks

The City of Albany Government's Recreation and Parks Department provides a diverse and comprehensive system of 77 park facilities throughout the City of Albany.

Gardens
Albany's Garden Club was established in 1996 and is located on the northeast side of Hillsman Park in the Palmyra Heights neighborhood.

Trails
Albany's Riverfront Trail is a  paved trail along the Flint River that connects Riverfront Park in downtown Albany to the Cox Landing Boat Ramp in northeast Albany, near Chehaw Park. The Oxford Environmental Park Nature Trail is an offshoot of the trail, which provides information about the ecological features of the area.

Shopping
Albany Mall, the premier shopping center in the region, opened in 1976.

Climate

The climate in this area is characterized by hot, humid summers and generally mild to cool winters.  According to the Köppen Climate Classification system, Albany has a humid subtropical climate, abbreviated "Cfa" on climate maps. Albany receives well above the national average amount of precipitation. Much of this comes in the form of heavy showers and thunderstorms. According to "Cities Ranked and Rated" (Bert Sperling and Peter Sander), Albany reports thunder on 86 days per year. This is more than twice the national average.

Demographics

MSA
According to the United States Census Bureau, the Albany, Georgia Metropolitan Statistical Area (MSA) had an estimated population of 157,308 and ranked 252nd in the U.S. in 2010. The MSA consists of Dougherty, Terrell, Lee, Worth, and Baker Counties.

City

2020 census

As of the 2020 United States census, there were 69,647 people, 25,640 households, and 13,815 families residing in the city.

2010 census
As of the census of 2010, there were 77,434 people, 29,781 households, and 18,515 families residing in the city.

The racial makeup of the city was 71.6% black, 25.2% white, 0.2% Native American, 0.8% Asian, 0.1% Pacific Islander, 0.9% from other races, and 1.1% from two or more races. Hispanic or Latino of any race were 2.1% of the population.

Of the 29,781 total households, 29.2% had children under the age of 18 living with them, 29.7% were married couples living together, 27.7% had a female householder with no husband present, and 37.8% were non-families. Households of individuals living alone made up 31.8% of the total, and 9.4% were someone living alone who was 65 years of age or older.  The average household size was 2.46 and the average family size was 3.11.

In the city, the population was spread out, with 27.8% under the age of 18, 13.0% from 18 to 24, 27.7% from 25 to 44, 19.6% from 45 to 64, and 11.3% who were 65 years of age or older.  The median age was 31.4 years. For every 100 females, there were 85.6 males.  For every 100 males age 18 and over, there were 116.7 females.

The median household income in the city was $25,191, and the median income for a family was $35,067. Males had a median income of $31,104 versus $27,407 for females. The per capita income for the city was $16,117.  About 31.9% of families and 39.9% of the population were below the poverty line, including 55.4% of those under age 18 and 13.8% of those persons age 65 and over.

Economy

Today, although the city is surrounded by pecan groves, pine trees, farms and plantations, almost none of the population is employed in agriculture. It has become heavily industrialized, and most business is conducted on a multinational scale. The city developed on both sides of the Flint River.

Health care, education and the Marine Corps Logistics Base Albany are the largest employers.  Manufacturing, transportation, and retail trade are also important foundations of Albany's economy, and the city acts as a hub for commerce in southwest Georgia.

On December 17, 2008, Cooper Tire and Rubber, one of Albany's largest employers, announced plans to close the local manufacturing facility.  Approximately 1,400 employees at the plant were projected to lose their jobs.

Business environment
As a result of the Great Recession, unemployment remained higher in Albany than the country average.  But in 2012 Albany continued to add more new jobs while other portions of the state were trying to stem the tide of joblessness.

Albany has a skilled workforce, makes continual upgrades to its infrastructure, and has improvements in public safety, such as its ISO fire rating of 2. It has numerous economic development initiatives, such as an Opportunity Zone, which offers a $3,500 tax credit per job created.

Top non-government employers in Dougherty County
 AT&T
 Coats and Clark, Inc.
 Miller Brewing Company
 Phoebe Putney Memorial Hospital
 Procter & Gamble
 Teleperformance USA
 United Parcel Service

Companies
 Georgia Pacific Corp.
 Kendrick Brothers
 Mars, Incorporated
 Mediacom
 Procter & Gamble
 Sherwood Pictures
 Thrush Aircraft

Arts and culture

Museums and the arts

 Albany Area Arts Council
 The Albany Chorale
 Albany Civic Center
 Albany Civil Rights Institute
 The Albany Concert Association
 Albany Municipal Auditorium
 Albany Museum of Art
 The Albany Symphony Orchestra
 Art Park on Pine
 Ballet Theatre South
 Flint RiverQuarium
 The Parks at Chehaw has one of two accredited zoos in the state.
 RiverQuarium Imagination Theater
 Theatre Albany
 Thronateeska Heritage Center
 Weatherbee Planetarium

Registered historic places
 Albany District Pecan Growers' Exchange
 Albany Housefurnishing Company
 Albany Municipal Auditorium
 Albany Railroad Depot Historic District
 Bridge House
 Carnegie Library of Albany
 Davis-Exchange Bank Building
 John A. Davis House
 Mount Zion Baptist Church
 New Albany Hotel
 Old St. Teresa's Catholic Church
 Rosenberg Brothers Department Store
 St. Nicholas Hotel
 Samuel Farkas House
 Tift Park
 U.S. Post Office and Courthouse
 Union Station Depot
 W. E. Smith House

Sports
 Albany was home to the Albany Polecats, who were a low-A class team that played in the South Atlantic League between 1992 and 1995. Albany was also home to the South Georgia Peanuts, who played in the South Coast League. They won the South Coast League championships in the league's inaugural season (2007) and were managed by former MLB shortstop Wally Backman. The league folded after that season.
 The Albany Panthers were an indoor football team based in Albany, Georgia. The team joined the Southern Indoor Football League (SIFL) during their inaugural season in 2010. When the SIFL folded, the team joined the Professional Indoor Football League  in 2012. The Panthers' home games were played at the James H. Gray Civic Center until 2014.
The Georgia Firebirds were an indoor football team that played in various semi-pro leagues as well as the professional American Indoor Football in 2016 and the National Arena League in 2017.

Memorials and sights

 Albany Civil Rights Memorial
 Albany Railroad Depot Historic District
 Astronauts Memorial
 Confederate Memorial Park
 The Flint Riverquarium
 Freedom Flame
 Freedom Walk
 The Guardian
 Radium Springs – one of the Seven Natural Wonders of Georgia
 Ray Charles Plaza
 RiverFront Park
 Royal Air Force Memorial
 Veterans Park

Festivals and events

City races include a  full marathon or a  half marathon. The full race is ranked as one of the top Boston Marathon qualifiers in the country, with almost 20% of all marathon finishers qualifying.

The annual Mardi Gras Street Festival takes place in downtown Albany the first weekend of March. Starting at noon and running until midnight, the festival coincides with the marathon and half marathon.

Government

Elected officials include a mayor and six city commissioners, each of whom serves a four-year term.  The commissioners are elected from single-member districts. An appointed city manager acts as the chief administrative officer. The city has been governed by a city commission and city manager since January 14, 1924.

The city government places responsibility for specific features into several departments.

Education

Public schools
The Dougherty County School System operates a system of five learning centers, fourteen public elementary schools, four public middle schools, three public high schools, and one alternative school. All schools are accredited by the Southern Association of Colleges and Schools (SACS) and the Georgia Accrediting Commission (GAC). The system had an enrollment in 2009–2010 of 15,838 students being taught by 1,070 teachers and 198 support and administrative personnel.

The following schools have distinctions:
 Alice Coachman Elementary School: 2009 National Blue Ribbon School, 2009 "No Excuses School" (Georgia Public Policy Foundation)
 Lincoln Elementary Magnet School: 2009–2010 Governor's Office of Students Achievement Bronze Award for Highest Percentage of Students Meeting & Exceeding Standards on the CRCT
 International Studies Elementary Charter School: Title 1 Distinguished School (10 consecutive years making AYP)
 Robert A. Cross Middle Magnet School: 2009–2010 Governor's Office of Students Achievement Gold Award for Highest Percentage of Students Meeting & Exceeding Standards on the CRCT

Private schools
Several private schools provide primary and secondary education, including:
 Byne Memorial Baptist School (BMBS)
 Deerfield-Windsor School (DWS)
 God's Foundation Christian Academy (GFCA)
 St. Teresa's Catholic School (STS)
 Sherwood Christian Academy (SCA)
 Christian Covenant Academy (CCA)

Higher education

Albany State University
The city is the location of Albany State University, founded as a pre-collegiate school in 1903. African Americans in the South had been intent since emancipation in gaining education and, by the turn of the 20th century, most were literate, as documented by W. E. B. Du Bois in his history, Black Reconstruction (1930). Albany State is notable as one of the few historically black colleges and universities to be part of the University System of Georgia.

Albany Technical College
Albany Technical College is part of the Technical College System of Georgia and teaches post-secondary vocational and occupational training subjects.

Georgia Military College (GMC) has a site at this campus and conducts some classes here.

Troy University
Albany is a site location of Troy University, one of many satellites which Troy has established throughout the Southeastern United States.  For more than 20 years, Troy University, a public non-profit institution of Alabama, has taught classes both in-class and online in Albany. Troy's Albany site has classes in criminal justice, psychology and various general studies, along with offering other undergraduate and master's degree programs online.

Public libraries

Dougherty County Public Library operates the public libraries serving Albany.

Media

Newspapers
 The Albany Herald, founded in 1891
 The Albany Journal, published since 1939; Tom Knighton is current editor and publisher
 The Albany Southwest Georgian, historically black newspaper founded by A. C. Searles, editor
 The Metro Gazette, offers positive news about the community; founded in 2010 by Judith Hampton-Thompson

Television stations
 Channel 10 WALB (NBC)
 Channel 10.2 WALB-DT2 (ABC)
 Channel 14 WABW (PBS-GPB) (Pelham)
 Channel 25 WACS (PBS-GPB) (Dawson)
 Channel 31 WFXL (FOX)
 Channel 44 WSWG (CBS)
 Channel 44.2 WSWG-DT2 (MyNet-WSST)
 Channel 44.3 WSWG-DT3 (CW+)
 Channel 55 WSST (MyNet)

FM radio stations
 88.5 W203AT (religious; translator for KEAR)
 89.3 WBJY (religious)
 90.3 WAEF (religious)
 90.7 WWQA (religious, bluegrass)
 91.7 WUNV (NPR – news, classical)
 92.7 WASU (Albany State University – college, jazz, urban)
 93.1 WSRD (religious, talk)
 93.5 WMRG (hip-hop/R&B) 
 93.9 WMTM (Classic hits)
 94.7 WDEC (hot adult contemporary)
 96.3 WJIZ (urban)
 97.3 WGEX "Power 97.3" (Top 40)
 98.1 WMRZ "Kiss" (adult urban)
 100.3 WOBB "B-100"(country)
 101.3 WTOA-LP Catholic radio
 101.7 WQVE "V101.7"(R&B, classic soul)
 102.1 WJST "Retro FM 102.1" (classic hits)
 102.5 W273AE (religious; translator for WYFK)
 103.5 WJAD "Rock 103" (classic and mainstream rock) (Leesburg)
 104.5 WKAK "Nash FM" (country) (formerly K-Country 104.5 as of June 2013)
 105.5 WZBN "Power 105... The King" (holy hip hop and contemporary gospel)
 106.1 WHKV (Christian contemporary)
 106.5 WZIQ (Christian)
 107.7 WEGC "Mix 107.7" (adult contemporary)

AM radio stations
 960 WJYZ (gospel)
 1250 WSRA (ESPN sports)
 1590 WALG (news, talk)

Infrastructure

Transportation

Air
Southwest Georgia Regional Airport (ABY) is a non-hub commercial service airport with service to Atlanta by Endeavor Air, a regional carrier for Delta. Both UPS and DHL use the airport as a sorting facility. In 2010, a master plan was completed.  It recommended moving forward with the Replacement Terminal Project.

Rail
Freight rail service is provided by Georgia Southwestern Railroad, Georgia and Florida Railway/Omnitrax, and Norfolk Southern Railway. Georgia and Florida Railway has its headquarters in Albany.

Several passenger trains from St. Louis, Chicago and Cincinnati in the Midwest, heading to Florida, made stops in Albany Union Station. The last of these, the Illinois Central's City of Miami made its final stop there in 1971.

Bus
Albany Transit System (ATS) has been operated by the city since 1974 and provides fixed-route and para-transit services in Albany and Dougherty County, including service to the airport. All buses are wheelchair accessible and are equipped with bicycle racks. The main transfer station is in downtown Albany, at the corner of Oglethorpe and Jackson.

In addition, a Greyhound bus station is located in downtown Albany, with connections to interstate service.

Roads

Transportation
While Albany is one of the largest cities in Georgia to not be served by an interstate, U.S. Route 19 and U.S. Route 82 provide thoroughfares through the city. The two join together north of the city for a short freeway known as the Liberty Expressway. Other major highways that run through the city include Georgia State Route 91, Georgia State Route 133, Georgia State Route 234, and Georgia State Route 520. Albany is located on Georgia State Route 300 (Georgia-Florida Parkway), which provides easy access to Cordele, and Interstate 75 to the northeast and south to Camilla, and Thomasville. The Liberty Expressway spans  serves as a bypass on Albany's north and east sides. Other highways that pass through Albany include US 19, US 82, and State Routes 3, 62, 91, 133, 234, and 520.

Bridges
Albany's Broad Avenue Memorial bridge, constructed in 1920 and comprising three open-spandrel concrete deck arch main spans and eight closed-spandrel deck arch spans, was closed in February 2009 after examination found it to be in unsafe condition. Deconstruction began in 2015 and the replacement segmental concrete box girder bridge was dedicated to veterans and opened on November 11, 2015.

In the early 1970s, construction of the Liberty-bypass bridges began. Construction of the bridges over the Flint River was completed much before the highway itself. They became known as the bridges to nowhere.

Energy infrastructure

Albany Water Gas and Light

Georgia Power
Portions of Albany are serviced by Georgia Power, which operates two electrical power plants within Dougherty County: coal-fired Plant Mitchell and the hydroelectric dam at Lake Worth, also known as Lake Chehaw.

Water management infrastructure
The Albany Water, Gas & Light Commission (WG&L) is a municipally-owned and operated utility system furnishing water, gas, and electricity to its broad–based customers. Albany WG&L, was founded in 1892 as the Albany Water Works, as the largest municipal user in Georgia.

The public water supply source for Albany-Dougherty County is groundwater obtained from four aquifers:
 Upper Floridan (locally called the Ocala) Aquifer
 Claiborne (formerly Tallahatta) Aquifer
 Clayton Formation
 Providence Aquifer

The water quality is considered to be excellent, needing only chlorination and fluoridation treatment.

Communications infrastructure
Both WG&L and AT&T offer communications infrastructure within the City of Albany.

Solid waste management

Health care
Albany is the home of a not-for-profit regional health system with a 26-county cachement area with Phoebe Putney Memorial Hospital at its hub.

Public safety

Law enforcement
Albany is serviced by the Albany Police Department (APD) which is divided into three districts, each having its own police center. The Dougherty County Police Department is responsible for the unincorporated area of Dougherty County. The Dougherty County Sheriff's Department is a law enforcement agency under the direction of the County Sheriff, an elected official.

Fire protection
The Albany Fire Department consists of more than 150 assigned personnel operating 11 fire stations in Dougherty County, seven of which are within the city limits.

EMS/EMT service
Dougherty County EMS has over 60 employees and services the county through one headquarters and five satellite stations.

Notable people
Ray Charles: Grammy Award–winning singer, songwriter, pianist, and composer
Alice Coachman: first black woman to win an Olympic gold medal
Mary Francis Hill Coley: midwife in Albany 1930–1966, inducted into Georgia Women of Achievement 2011
Paula Deen: TV personality and cooking show host
Field Mob: hip hop group
Bart Oates: 5-time NFL pro-bowler and 3-time Super Bowl Champion
McCree Harris: activist with the Albany Movement
Reginald D. Hunter: stand-up comedian
Harry James: Swing era trumpet player and bandleader
Alex Kendrick, actor/director/producer/filmmaker, co-founder of Sherwood Pictures and Kendrick Brothers
Stephen Kendrick, actor/director/producer/filmmaker, co-founder of Sherwood Pictures and Kendrick Brothers
Ray Knight: former Major League Baseball infielder best remembered for his time with the 1986 World Series Champion New York Mets
Paul McKinney: Pennsylvania State Senator for the 8th district from 1975 to 1982
Phillip Phillips: singer-songwriter and actor who won the eleventh season of American Idol
Bobby Rush: pastor and U.S. Representative from Illinois
Kylie Sonique Love: drag queen, winner of RuPaul's Drag Race All Stars (season 6)
Harry Spilman: former player for the Houston Astros and San Francisco Giants
Angelo Taylor: athlete, Olympic gold medalist
Jo Marie Payton, actress
Geraldine W. Travis: first black women to serve in the Montana House of Representatives
James Wheeler (1937–2014), Chicago blues guitarist, singer and songwriter

References

Further reading
 Carolyn Clive, Frances Davis, and Tom Liner, eds., Glancing Backward: Albany, Georgia, 1836–1986 (Albany, Ga.: Dougherty County School System and Sesquicentennial Publication Committee, 1986).
 Lee W. Formwalt, "A Garden of Irony and Diversity," in The New Georgia Guide (Athens: University of Georgia Press, 1996).
 Joseph Winthrop Holley, You Can't Build a Chimney from the Top: The South through the Life of a Negro Educator (New York: William-Frederick Press, 1948).
 Thronateeska Chapter, Daughters of the American Revolution, History and Reminiscences of Dougherty County, Georgia (1924; reprint, Spartanburg, S.C.: Reprint Co., 1978).
 Works Progress Administration, Historical Background of Dougherty County, 1836–1940 (Atlanta: Cherokee, 1981).

External links

 City of Albany official website
 South Georgia Historic Newspapers Archive Digital Library of Georgia
 Old U.S. Post Office and Courthouse
 Albany's First Brick House historical marker
 

 
Cities in Georgia (U.S. state)
Cities in Dougherty County, Georgia
Albany metropolitan area, Georgia
Populated places established in 1836
County seats in Georgia (U.S. state)
Populated places in Dougherty County, Georgia
Geography of Dougherty County, Georgia
1836 establishments in Georgia (U.S. state)